Thomas Schnauz (born ) is an American television producer and television writer. His credits include The X-Files, The Lone Gunmen, Night Stalker, Reaper, Breaking Bad, and Better Call Saul.

Personal life
Schnauz was born in Kearny, New Jersey. He attended New York University's Tisch School of the Arts, where he first met fellow student Vince Gilligan. Schnauz graduated from Tisch in 1988.

Career
Schnauz started his career in various production jobs. His first screenplay was called Spirits in Passing. He eventually joined Vince Gilligan on the writing staff of The X-Files and its spinoff show, The Lone Gunmen. He also co-wrote the screenplays for the 2008 film Otis and the 2008 television film Infected. In 2010, he re-teamed with Gilligan on Breaking Bad, where he remained through the show's 2013 conclusion.

Schnauz signed a two-year overall deal with Sony Pictures Television in November 2014.

Schnauz served as co-executive producer on AMC's Breaking Bad spinoff series Better Call Saul. He has written and/or directed a number of its episodes including "Pimento", the penultimate episode of the show's first season, which received critical acclaim, as well as "Plan and Execution", the finale of the sixth season's first half that also received praise for Schnauz's writing.

In April 2015, it was reported that he had been tapped to write the screenplay for "a revisionist take" on "Jack and the Beanstalk", also to be produced by Vince Gilligan.

In 2019, Schnauz joined other WGA writers in firing their agents as part of the WGA's stand against the ATA and the practice of packaging.

Filmography 
Writer

Production staff

Screenplays

Awards and nominations
Schnauz has been nominated for Writers Guild of America Awards on six occasions, winning three times, for his work on the writing staffs of Breaking Bad and Better Call Saul. Schnauz shared in the show's 2010 Dramatic Series nomination, and subsequent category wins in 2011, 2012 and 2013, for his work on Breaking Bad. He was nominated again in 2015 and 2016 in the Dramatic Series category for Better Call Saul.

He was nominated for a Primetime Emmy Award for Outstanding Writing in a Drama Series for the 2012 Breaking Bad episode "Say My Name".

References

External links

American television producers
American television writers
Living people
Place of birth missing (living people)
Year of birth missing (living people)
American television directors
American male screenwriters
Tisch School of the Arts alumni
American male television writers